Sabbatai Zevi (August 1, 1626 – c. September 17, 1676), also spelled Shabbetai Ẓevi, Shabbeṯāy Ṣeḇī, Shabsai Tzvi, Sabbatai Zvi, was a Jewish mystic and ordained rabbi from Smyrna (now İzmir, Turkey). A kabbalist of Romaniote or Sephardic origin, Zevi, who was active throughout the Ottoman Empire, claimed to be the long-awaited Jewish Messiah. He was the founder of the Sabbatean movement, whose followers subsequently came to be known as Dönme (converts) or crypto-Jews.

Upon arriving in Constantinople in February 1666, Sabbatai was imprisoned on the order of the grand vizier Köprülüzade Fazıl Ahmed Pasha; in September of that same year, after being moved from different prisons around the capital to Adrianople, (modern Edirne, the imperial court's then seat) to be judged on accusations of fomenting sedition, Sabbatai was given the choice of either facing death by some type of ordeal, or of converting to Islam by the Grand Vizier representing the Sultan of the Ottoman Empire, Mehmed IV. Sabbatai seems to have chosen the latter course, donning a turban from that time on. The heads of the Ottoman state then rewarded him with a generous pension for complying with their political and religious plans.

About 300 families who followed Zevi also converted to Islam and became known as Dönme (converts). Subsequently, the Ottomans banished him twice, first to Constantinople, and, when he was heard singing Psalms with the Jews, to a small town known today as Ulcinj in present-day Montenegro. He later died in isolation.

Early life and education
Sabbatai Zevi was born in the Ottoman city of Smyrna, supposedly on Tisha B'Av 1626, the Jewish holy day of mourning. In Hebrew Sabbatai means Saturn, and in Jewish tradition "the reign of Sabbatai", the highest planet, was often linked to the advent of the Messiah. Zevi's family were Romaniote Jews from Patras; his father, Mordecai, was a poultry dealer in the Morea. During the war between Turkey and Venice, Smyrna became the center of Levantine trade and Mordecai became the Smyrna agent of an English trading house, achieving some wealth in the process.

In accordance with the prevailing Jewish custom of the time, Sabbatai's father had him study the Talmud. He attended a yeshiva under the rabbi of Smyrna, Joseph Escapa. Studies in halakha, or Jewish law, did not appeal to him, but apparently Zevi did attain proficiency in the Talmud. At the same time, he was fascinated by mysticism and the Kabbalah and was influenced by Isaac Luria. The practical Kabbalah, whose devotees used asceticism to communicate with God and the angels, to predict the future and perform all sorts of miracles, was especially appealing to him. As well as Luria's writings, he read the Zohar and practiced asceticism and purification exercises called tikkunim.

Personal history

Influence of English millenarianism
During the first half of the 17th century, millenarian ideas about the approach of the messianic time were popular. They included ideas about the redemption of the Jews and their return to the land of Israel, with independent sovereignty. The apocalyptic year was identified by Christian authors as 1666 and millenarianism was widespread in England. This belief was so prevalent that Manasseh ben Israel, in his letter to Oliver Cromwell and the Rump Parliament, appealed to it as a reason to re-admit Jews into England, saying, "[T]he opinions of many Christians and mine do concur herein, that we both believe that the restoring time of our Nation into their native country is very near at hand."

As he was the agent for an English trading house in Smyrna, Sabbatai's father must have had business contact with English people and it's possible that his son learned something about Western millenarian expectations at home. Scholars are still assessing how much influence English and Dutch Calvinist millenarianism had on the messianic movement that developed around Zevi's activities.

Claims to being the expected Jewish Messiah
Along with general messianic beliefs, there was another computation, based on a passage in the Zohar (a famous Jewish mystical text), that Israel would be redeemed by the long-awaited Jewish Messiah in 1648.

In 1648, Sabbatai announced to his followers in Smyrna that he was the anticipated messianic redeemer. To prove this, he started to pronounce the Tetragrammaton, an act which Judaism prohibited to all but the high priest in the Temple in Jerusalem on the Day of Atonement. For scholars acquainted with rabbinical and Kabbalistic literature, this act was therefore highly symbolic. Sabbatai also claimed that he could fly, but told his followers that he couldn't do so in public because they were 'not worthy enough' to witness such a sight. He also claimed to have visions of God. Sabbatai revealed his claim to being the Messiah early on to Isaac Silveyra and Moses Pinheiro, the latter a brother-in-law of the Italian rabbi and Kabbalist Joseph Ergas.

However, at a mere twenty-two, Sabbatai was still too young to be thought of as an established rabbinic authority; his influence on the local community was limited. Even though he had led the pious life of a mystic in Smyrna for several years, the older, more established rabbinic leadership was suspicious of his activities and the local college of rabbis. Headed by his teacher, Joseph Escapa, they kept a watchful eye on him. When his messianic pretensions became too bold, he and his followers were subjected to an edict of cherem, a type of excommunication in Judaism.

In about 1651 (according to others, 1654), the rabbis banished Sabbatai and his disciples from Smyrna. It is uncertain where he went from there, but by 1658, he surfaced in Constantinople. There, he met a preacher, Abraham Yachini (a disciple of the Talmudic scholar Joseph di Trani), who confirmed his messianic mission. Yachini is said to have forged a manuscript in archaic characters which bore testimony to Sabbatai's claim to being the Messiah. It was entitled The Great Wisdom of Solomon, and began:
"I, Abraham, was confined in a cave for forty years, and I wondered greatly that the time of miracles did not arrive. Then was heard a voice proclaiming, 'A son will be born in the Hebrew year 5386 [the year 1626 CE] to Mordecai Zevi; and he will be called Shabbethai. He will humble the great dragon; ... he, the true Messiah, will sit upon My throne."

In Salonica, Cairo, and Jerusalem

Armed with this document, Sabbatai chose Salonica, at that time a center of Kabbalism, as his base. Proclaiming himself the Messiah or "anointed one," he gained a large following and put on all sorts of mystical events—e.g., the celebration of his marriage as the "One Without End" (the Ein Sof) with the Torah, preparing a solemn festival to which he invited his friends. But the rabbis of Salonica, headed by Rabbi Hiyya Abraham Di Boton, banished him from the city and sources differ as to the route he then took, with Alexandria, Athens, Constantinople, Jerusalem, and Smyrna mentioned as temporary bases. Eventually he settled in Cairo, where he lived for about two years (1660–1662).

There he befriended Raphael Joseph Halabi (of Aleppo), a wealthy and influential Jew who held the high position of mint-master and tax-farmer in Cairo under the Ottoman government. Raphael Joseph led an ascetic life, which included fasting, bathing in cold water, and scourging himself at night, and used his great wealth for charity, supporting poor Talmudists and Kabbalists, fifty of whom reportedly dined at his table regularly. He became a supporter and promoter of Sabbati's messianic claims.

In about 1663 Sabbatai moved on to Jerusalem where he resumed his former ascetic practice of frequent fasting and other penances. Many saw this as proof of his extraordinary piety. He was said to have a good voice, and attracted large audiences when he sang psalms all night long, or Spanish love-songs to which he gave mystical interpretations. At other times he prayed and cried at the graves of pious men and women or distributed sweetmeats to children on the streets. Gradually he gathered a larger circle of adherents.

At the time the Jewish community in Jerusalem was in dire need of money to pay the heavy taxes levied by the Ottoman government. Known as the favourite of the rich and powerful Raphael Joseph Halabi in Cairo, Sabbatai was chosen to appeal to him for money and support and his success in getting the funds to pay off the Turks raised his prestige. His followers dated his public career from this journey to Cairo.

Marriage to Sarah
Another event that took place during his second stay in Cairo helped spread Sabbatai's fame in the Jewish world. During the Chmielnicki massacres in Poland, a young Jewish orphan named Sarah was found by Christians and sent to a convent to be cared for. After ten years, aged about sixteen, she escaped (she claimed through a miracle), and made her way to Amsterdam and then to Livorno where, according to reports, she led a life of prostitution while also conceiving the notion that she would become the bride of the Messiah, whose appearance was thought to be imminent.

When a report of her adventures reached Cairo, Sabbatai claimed that such a consort had been promised to him in a dream because he, as the Messiah, was bound to fall in love with an unchaste woman. He reportedly sent messengers to Livorno to bring Sarah to him, and they were married at Halabi's house. Her beauty and eccentricity reportedly helped him gain new followers. Through her a new romantic and licentious element entered Sabbatai's career. The overturning of her past life was interpreted by Sabbatai's followers as further confirmation of his messiahship, following the biblical story of the prophet Hosea, who had also been commanded to take a "wife of whoredom" as the first symbolic act of his calling.

Nathan of Gaza

With Halabi's financial and political backing, a charming wife, and many additional followers, Sabbatai returned to Jerusalem in triumph. Passing through the city of Gaza, which at the time had an important Jewish community, he met Nathan Benjamin Levi, known since as Nathan of Gaza (נתן העזתי Nathan Ha'Azzati), who became very active in Sabbatai's messianic career, serving as his right-hand man and declaring himself to be the risen Elijah, who, it was predicted, would proclaim the arrival of the Messiah. In 1665, Nathan announced that the Messianic age would begin in 1666 with the conquest of the world without bloodshed. The Messiah would lead the Ten Lost Tribes back to the Holy Land, "riding on a lion with a seven-headed dragon in its jaws".

The rabbis of Jerusalem viewed Sabbatai's movement with great suspicion, and threatened its followers with excommunication. Acknowledging that Jerusalem was not the best place to carry out his plans, Sabbatai left for his native Smyrna, and Nathan proclaimed that henceforth Gaza rather than Jerusalem would be the sacred city. On his way from Jerusalem to Smyrna, Sabbatai was greeted enthusiastically in Aleppo. In Smyrna, which he reached in the autumn of 1665, great homage was paid to him. After some hesitation, he declared himself to be the expected Messiah during the Jewish New Year in 1665; his declaration was made in the synagogue, with the blowing of horns, and shouts of "Long live our King, our Messiah!"

His followers then began to refer to him with the title AMIRAH, a Hebrew acronym for the phrase "Our Lord and King, his Majesty be exalted" (Adoneinu Malkeinu Yarum Hodo).

Proclaimed messiah

Assisted by his wife, Sabbatai became the leader of the community and used his power to crush any opposition. He deposed the existing rabbi of Smyrna, Aaron Lapapa, and appointed Chaim Benveniste in his place. His fame began to extend far and wide. Italy, Germany, and the Netherlands were already centres of his messianic movement, and the Jews of Hamburg and Amsterdam learned of the events in Smyrna from trustworthy Christians. Henry Oldenburg, a distinguished German savant who became the first secretary of the Royal Society, wrote to Baruch Spinoza (Spinozae Epistolae No 33): "All the world here is talking of a rumour of the return of the Israelites ... to their own country. ... Should the news be confirmed, it may bring about a revolution in all things."

Sabbatai's followers soon included many prominent rabbis, such as Isaac Aboab da Fonseca, Moses Raphael de Aguilar, Moses Galante, Moses Zacuto, and Chaim Benveniste. Dionysius Musaphia, an adherent of Spinoza, also became a follower. Meanwhile fantastic reports circulated and were widely believed. For example, it was said, "In the north of Scotland a ship had appeared with silken sails and ropes, manned by sailors who spoke Hebrew. The flag bore the inscription 'The Twelve Tribes of Israel'." The Jewish community of Avignon, France prepared to emigrate to the new kingdom in the spring of 1666.

Jewish readiness to believe Sabbatai Zevi's messianic claims may largely be explained by the desperate state of European Jewry in the mid-17th century. The bloody pogroms of Bohdan Khmelnytsky had wiped out an estimated 100,000 Jews in Eastern Europe (about one third of Europe's Jewish population at the time) and destroyed many centres of Jewish learning and communal life. For most of the Jews of Europe, therefore, this was a propitious moment for the messiah to deliver the promised salvation.

Spread of Sabbatai Zevi's influence

Probably with his consent, Sabbatai's adherents planned to abolish many ritualistic observances because, according to a minority opinion in the Talmud, in the messianic time there would no longer be holy obligations. The fast of the Tenth of Tevet became a day of feasting and rejoicing. Samuel Primo, who became Sabbatai's secretary when he went to Smyrna, directed the following circular to all of the Jews in the name of the Messiah:
"The first-begotten Son of God, Shabbethai Tebi, Messiah and Redeemer of the people of Israel, to all the sons of Israel, Peace! Since ye have been deemed worthy to behold the great day and the fulfilment of God's word by the Prophets, your lament and sorrow must be changed into joy, and your fasting into merriment; for ye shall weep no more. Rejoice with song and melody, and change the day formerly spent in sadness and sorrow into a day of jubilee, because I have appeared."

Primo's message was considered blasphemous, as Sabbatai wanted to celebrate his own birthday rather than the holy day. There was outrage and dissension in the communities, while many of the leaders who had been sympathetic to the movement were shocked by such radical innovations. Solomon Algazi, a prominent Talmudist of Smyrna, and other members of the rabbinate who opposed the abolition of the fast, narrowly escaped death at the hands of Sabbatai's followers.

In Constantinople
At the beginning of 1666, Sabbatai left Smyrna for Constantinople (İstanbul in present-day Turkey), possibly forced out by city officials. Since Nathan of Gaza had prophesied that, once in Constantinople, Sabbatai would place the sultan's crown on his own head, the grand vizier, Köprülüzade Fazıl Ahmed Pasha, ordered his immediate arrest and had him imprisoned, maybe to avoid any doubts as to the power still wielded by the Turkish Sultanate. However, his imprisonment discouraged neither Sabbatai nor his followers. He was treated well in prison, perhaps because of bribes which seems to have strengthened his followers' belief in him. Meanwhile Nathan of Gaza, Abraham Yachini and others circulated fabulous reports about the miraculous deeds "the Messiah" was supposedly performing in the Turkish capital, and the messianic expectations in the Jewish diasporas continued to rise.

At Abydos (Migdal Oz)
After two months' imprisonment in Constantinople, Sabbatai was moved to the state prison-castle at Abydos accompanied by some of his friends. The Sabbataians then renamed the fortress Migdal Oz (Tower [of] Strength). As Sabbatai had arrived on the day preceding Passover, he slew a paschal lamb for himself and his followers, and ate it with its fat, a violation of Jewish Law. He is said to have pronounced over it the benediction: "Blessed be God who hath restored again that which was forbidden."

The immense sums sent to him by his rich followers, the charms of the queenly Sarah, and the cooperation shown by the Turkish officials and others enabled Sabbatai to show off almost royal splendour in the prison at Abydos. Accounts of his life there were exaggerated and spread among Jews in Europe, Asia, and Africa, and in some parts of Europe, Jews began to unroof their houses and prepare for a new "exodus". In almost every synagogue, Sabbatai's initials were posted, and prayers for him were inserted in the following form: "Bless our Lord and King, the holy and righteous Sabbatai Zevi, the Messiah of the God of Jacob." In Hamburg, the council introduced the custom of praying for Sabbatai not only on Saturday (the Jewish Sabbath), but also on Monday and Thursday; unbelievers were compelled to remain in the synagogue and join in the prayer with a loud Amen. Sabbatai's picture was printed together with that of King David in most of the prayer-books, along with his Kabbalistic formulas and penances.

Such innovations caused great commotion in some communities. In Moravia excitement reached such a pitch that the government had to intervene, while at Sale, Morocco, the emir ordered a persecution of the Jews. During this period Sabbatai declared the fasts of the Seventeenth of Tammuz and the Ninth of Av (his birthday) would henceforth be feast-days, and contemplated converting the Day of Atonement to one of celebration.

Nehemiah ha-Kohen

While Sabbatai was in Abydos prison an incident occurred which ultimately led to his downfall. Two prominent Polish Talmudists from Lwów, Lesser Poland, who were among his prison visitors, informed Sabbatai that in their native country a prophet, Nehemiah ha-Kohen, had announced the coming of the Messiah. Sabbatai ordered the prophet to appear before him (see Jew. Encyc. ix. 212a, s.v. Nehemiah ha-Kohen). Nehemiah obeyed, reaching Abydos after a journey of three months at the beginning of September, 1666. The meeting did not go well, and some Sabbataians are said to have contemplated murdering the rival.

Conversion to Islam
Nehemiah, however, escaped to Constantinople, where he pretended to embrace Islam to get an audience with the kaymakam to tell him of Sabbatai's ambitions. The kaymakam informed Sultan Mehmed IV and Sabbatai was removed from Abydos and taken to Adrianople, where the vizier gave him three choices; subject himself to a trial of his divinity in the form of a volley of arrows (should the archers miss, his divinity would be proven); be impaled; or convert to Islam.

On the following day (September 16, 1666) Zevi appeared before the sultan, cast off his Jewish garb and put a Turkish turban on his head, thereby accomplishing his conversion to Islam. Satisfied, the sultan rewarded Sabbatai by conferring on him the title (Mahmed) Effendi, and appointing him as his doorkeeper on a generous salary. Sarah and approximately 300 families among his followers also converted to Islam. Thereafter these new Muslims were known as Dönme. Sabbatai was ordered to take a second wife to confirm his conversion. Some days afterwards, he wrote to the community in Smyrna: "God has made me an Ishmaelite; He commanded, and it was done. The ninth day of my regeneration."

Disillusionment

Sabbatai's conversion devastated his followers, and Muslims and Christians alike ridiculed them. In spite of his apostasy, many of his adherents still clung to their belief in him, claiming that his conversion was a part of the messianic scheme. Those such as Nathan of Gaza and Primo who were interested in maintaining the movement encouraged such belief. In many communities, the Seventeenth of Tammuz and the Ninth of Av were still observed as feast-days in spite of bans and excommunications by the rabbis.

At times Sabbatai assumed the role of a pious Muslim and reviled Judaism; at others he associated with Jews as one of their own faith. In March, 1668, he announced that he had been filled with the "Holy Spirit" at Passover, and had received a "revelation."

Either Sabbatai or one of his followers published a mystical work claiming he was the true Messiah in spite of his conversion and that his goal was to bring thousands of Muslims to Judaism. However, he told the sultan that he was trying to convert Jews to Islam, and the sultan permitted him to associate with other Jews and preach in their synagogues.

Last years
Gradually the Turks tired of Sabbatai's antics, ending his doorkeeper's salary. At the beginning of 1673, the sultan had Zevi exiled to Ulcinj (Dulcigno) where his wife died in 1674. Zevi then married Esther, the daughter of rabbi Joseph Filosoff of Thessaloniki.

Death
In August 1676, Sabbatai wrote to the Jewish Community in Berat, Albania, requesting religious books. Shortly afterwards he died in isolation, according to some accounts on September 17, 1676, the High Holy Day of Yom Kippur. Upon his death, his widow, brother and children by his first wife moved to Thessaloniki.

His tomb was believed for a long time to have been in Berat, at a tekke built in the yard of the Imperial Mosque, where a tomb stood until 1967. However, more recent research done in 1985 has suggested that he was actually buried in Dulcigno. His biographer Gershom Scholem mentions that his tomb was visited by Dönme pilgrims from Salonika until the early 20th century.

"By the 1680s, the Dönme had congregated in Salonica, the cosmopolitan and majority-Jewish city in Ottoman Greece. For the next 250 years, they would lead an independent communal life—intermarrying, doing business together, maintaining their own shrines, and handing down their secret traditions."

Legacy 

By the 19th century, the Dönme had become prominent in the tobacco and textile trades. They established progressive schools and some members became politically active. Some joined the Committee of Union and Progress (CUP), the revolutionary party known as the Young Turks. With independence, in the 1910s, Greece expelled the Muslims, including the Dönme, from its territory. Most migrated to Turkey, where by the mid-20th century they were becoming highly assimilated.

Although little is known about them, various groups called Dönme continue to follow Sabbatai Zevi today, mostly in Turkey. Estimates of the numbers vary. Many sources claim that there are fewer than 100,000 although some claim there are several hundred thousand in Turkey. They have been described as presenting themselves as Muslim in public whilst practising their own forms of messianic/mystical Jewish beliefs in private.

The Dönme eventually split into three sects, each with quite different beliefs, as Ottoman Jewish scholars Abraham Danon, and Joseph Néhama pointed out in French-language Jewish Studies journal articles over a hundred years ago. In the 1930s a comprehensive study on the history of the sects was also published in French by Abraham Galanté. More recently, Professor Cengiz Şişman has published a new study called The Burden of Silence. According to a review published in the Israeli newspaper Jerusalem Post, the branch known as Karakaş follow Sufi-influenced practices, while the Kapancıs have not been influenced by Islam at all and are now completely secular.

A house in the centre of İzmir close to the Agora has long been associated with Sabbetai Zevi. In ruins as recently as 2015, it has since been restored.

See also

 Frankism
 Isaac La Peyrère
 Jacob Frank
 Jewish Messiah claimants
 Jews in apostasy
 List of messiah claimants
 Schisms among the Jews
 "Who is a Jew?"

Notes

Bibliography
 Bali, Rifat N.,  A Scapegoat for All Seasons: The Dönmes or Crypto-Jews of Turkey, Istanbul, The ISIS Press, 2008.
 Encyclopaedia Judaica, article: "Shabbetai Zevi," 2nd edn, Farmington Hills, Michigan, 2007, vol. 18, pp. 340–359. .
 Freely, John The Lost Messiah: In Search of the Mystical Rabbi Sabbatai Sevi, New York, Overlook Press, 2001. .
 Goldish, Matt, The Sabbatean Prophets, Cambridge, Harvard University Press, 2004.
 
 Haven, Alexander van der, From Lowly Metaphor to Divine Flesh: Sarah the Ashkenazi, Sabbatai Tsevi's Messianic Queen and the Sabbatian Movement. Menasseh ben Israel Instituut Studies 7, Amsterdam, University of Amsterdam/Menasseh ben Israel Institute, 2012. .
 Idel, Moshe, Messianic Mystics, New Haven, Yale University Press, 1998 (Chapter 6: Sabbateanism and Mysticism, pp. 183–211).
 Lucca, Paolo.  "Šabbetay Ṣewi and the Messianic Temptations of Ottoman Jews in the Seventeenth Century According to Christian Armenian Sources" in Camilla Adang and Sabine Schmidtke (eds.) Contacts and Controversies between Muslims, Jews and Christians in the Ottoman Empire and Pre-Modern Iran, Würzburg, Ergon, 2010, pp. 197–206.  (This is the only edition shown as available on the  Amazon German website on 3 July 2022, and there is no edition shown at all on the Amazon UK website; the pagination may not be the same as that shown above, which was for an edition in 2016, printed on commission, as described in the previous version.)
 Maciejko, Paweł, (ed.), Sabbatian Heresy: Writings on Mysticism, Messianism, & the Origins of Jewish Modernity. Waltham, Mass., Brandeis University Press, 2017.
 Mazower, Mark, Salonica, City of Ghosts: Christians, Muslims, and Jews, 1430–1950. New York, Alfred A. Knopf, 2005, pp. 69–71.
 Rapoport-Albert, Ada, Women and the Messianic Heresy of Sabbatai Zevi, 1666–1816, Oxford, The Littman Library of Jewish Civilisation, 2011. 
 Scholem, Gershom, Sabbatai Sevi: The Mystical Messiah: 1626–1676, London, Routledge Kegan Paul, 1973 ; American edition: Princeton University Press, 1973  (hardcover edn.).
 Sisman, Cengiz, The Burden of Silence: Sabbatai Sevi and the Evolution of the Ottoman-Turkish Dönmes, New York, Oxford University Press, 2015.
 Sisman, Cengiz, Transcending Diaspora: Studies on Sabbateanism and Dönmes, Istanbul, Libra Publishing, 2016.

References

Graetz, Heinrich, History of the Jews, The Jewish Publication Society of America, Philadelphia, 1895, vol. V, pp 51–85.

Further reading
Dweck, Yaacob Dissident Rabbi: The Life of Jacob Sasportas (Princeton University Press, 2019)

Litvinoff, Barnet Another Time, Another Voice: A novel of the seventeenth century, London, W. H. Allen, 1971

External links

 SHABBETAI ẒEVI by Gershom Scholem. Encyclopaedia Judaica article at Encyclopedia.com
 Sabbatai Zevi by Kaufmann Kohler and Henry Malter. The Jewish Encyclopedia
 Shabbetai Zvi Jewish Virtual Library
 Shabbetai Tsvi, False Messiah Video Lecture by Henry Abramson
 In search of followers of the false messiah by Orly Halpern. About Aubrey Ross and his book The Messiah of Turkey. Haaretz 28 June 2002
 Shabbetai Tzvi and the Dangers of Messianic Kabbala Video lecture by Rabbi Menachem Levine

1626 births
1676 deaths
17th-century apocalypticists
17th-century rabbis from the Ottoman Empire
17th-century Sephardi Jews
Converts to Islam from Judaism
Jewish messiah claimants
Kabbalists
People from İzmir
Romaniote Jews
 
Sephardi Jews from the Ottoman Empire
Smyrniote Jews